Melvin and Maureen's Music-a-Grams is an educational CBBC show about music which ran from 1992 to 1993 (with repeat transmissions continuing until 1997), starring Sophie Aldred and Matthew Devitt. The show was rerun on CBeebies in 2007.

Melvin and Maureen ran a music shop which sold "Music-A-Grams"- a recording of music for a certain purpose.  Sometimes customers came asking for a particular music-a-gram.  Melvin and Maureen also sang songs, and told stories to illustrate how musical instruments could be used to create different effects, or on a particular theme.  The stories also involved a trio of soft toys, led by a teddy bear named Groovy Ted, who were on a constant quest for musical stardom.

Episodes

 Pilot: Funniest Instrument: Melvin and Maureen are set a riddle by entertainer Mr. Baggage; what is the funniest instrument in the world?
 The Wriggle: The gang try different types of dancing, then invent a style of their own, for dance workshop manager Tristram,
 Dastardly Landlady: Melvin and Maureen use their music-a-grams to outwit their evil landlady
 Repercussions: Melvin learns that a pair of his bongo drums may be priceless.  Whilst he turns the music shop upside-down looking for them, he and Maureen also showcase the vast range of percussion instruments.
 Orchestra-ra-ra: Melvin and Maureen are asked to talk about the orchestra, but argue over who knows most
 Celebration: Maureen awaits the results of a music exam
 Au Naturel: Maureen grows a musical tree
 Supa Dupa Man: A superhero flies into the shop.  He is bored of his jingle, and wants Melvin and Maureen to find him a new one.
 Goldfish Cabaret: Melvin and Maureen compose a goldfish song and comedy routine

References

External links
 

1992 British television series debuts
1993 British television series endings
1990s British children's television series
BBC children's television shows
1990s British music television series